The coastal rock gecko (Pristurus simonettai) is a species of lizard in the family Sphaerodactylidae. The species is endemic to Somalia.

Etymology
The specific name, simonettai, is in honor of Italian zoologist Alberto Mario Simonetta (born 1930).

Geographic range
P. simonettai is found in southern Somalia.

Description
The body of P. simonettai is almost completely covered with strongly carinate imbricate scales.

Reproduction
P. simonettai is oviparous.

References

Further reading
Arnold EN (2009). "Relationships, evolution and biogeography of Semaphore geckos, Pristurus (Squamata, Sphaerodactylidae) based on morphology". Zootaxa 2060: 1–21. 
Lanza B (1990). "Amphibians and reptiles of the Somali Democratic Republic: check list and biogeography". Biogeographia 14: 407–465. 
Lanza B, Sassi AR (1968). "On a new genus and species of gekkonid lizard from Somalia, ricerche sulla fauna della Somalia promosse dall'Istituto di Zoologia e dal Museo Zoologico dell'Università di Firenze: XXIX ". Monitore Zoologico Italiano, Supplemento 2: 17–26. (Geisopristurus, new genus; G. simonettai, new species). (in English, with an abstract in Italian).
Rösler H (2000). "Kommentierte Liste der rezent, subrezent und fossil bekannten Geckotaxa (Reptilia: Gekkonomorpha)". Gekkota 2: 28–153. (Pristurus simonettai, p. 106). (in German).

Pristurus
Geckos of Africa
Reptiles of Somalia
Endemic fauna of Somalia
Reptiles described in 1968
Taxa named by Benedetto Lanza